Julius Baer (born Isaac Baer; January 2, 1857 – March 9, 1922) was a German-born Swiss banker, businessman and philanthropist. Baer was the founder and namesake of Julius Baer Group, and the patriarch of the Baer family.

Early life and education 
Baer was born in Heidelsheim (today part of Bruchsal), Kingdom of Württemberg, German Empire, to Joseph (1816–1891) and Rosina (née Dreyfuss; 1819–1907) Baer, into a Jewish family. His father worked as private money lender and merchant of animal skins, while his mother was a homemaker. He was the second youngest of five siblings. Baer was educated at the Jewish School of Heidelsheim and completed a banking apprenticeship at Bankhaus August Gerstle in Augsburg from 1883 to 1885.

Career 

In 1886, he became a partner in the private bank Samuel Dukas & Co. in Basel, Switzerland. A position he continued to hold until 1896, when he was deployed by his brother-in-law Ludwig Hirschhorn, to Zürich. He became a partner in Bank Hirschhorn, Uhl & Bär, which existed since 1890, and is the ultimate predecessor of today's Julius Baer Group. Since 1901, the bank beared only his name, and was known as Julius Bär & Co., which became one of the leading Swiss private banks.

He was on several board of directors including Lake Thun railway line, Südostbahn and Oerlikon-Bührle (1908–1922).

Family 
In 1891, he married Marie Ulrich (1869–1917), with whom he had three sons;

 Richard Josef Baer (1892–1940), mathematician and physicist

 Walter Jakob Baer (1895–1970), director at Julius Baer
 Werner Baer (1899–1960), director at Julius Baer

His grandson, Hans J. Baer (1927–2011), was a long-term executive director and president of Julius Baer, who became known through his involvement as a mediator in retrieving Jewish funds in the Volcker Commission in the 1990s.

Literature 

 Publications about Julius Baer in the Swiss National Library 
 Baer, Julius by Ueli Müller in Historical Dictionary of Switzerland (HLS)

References 

Swiss bankers
1857 births
1922 deaths